is a  active stratovolcano in Kusatsu, Gunma, Japan. It is called Kusatsu Shirane to differentiate it from the Mount Nikkō-Shirane on the other side of Gunma Prefecture.  The summit of Kusatsu-Shirane volcano, located immediately north of Asama volcano, consists of a series of overlapping pyroclastic cones and three crater lakes.  The largest of these is Yu-gama, an acidic emerald green lake with rafts of yellow sulfur sometimes seen floating on its surface.

On January 23, 2018, a minor phreatic eruption of the volcano occurred. One person was killed, and others were injured in an avalanche triggered by the eruption. The next day, new activity forced police to suspend search operations. One month after the eruption, it was announced by prefectural officials that only the summit of the volcano was off limits to the public.

See also
 List of volcanoes in Japan
 List of mountains in Japan

References

External links 

 Kusatsu-Shiranesan - Japan Meteorological Agency 
  - Japan Meteorological Agency
 Kusatsu-Shirane Volcano - Geological Survey of Japan

Mountains of Gunma Prefecture
Volcanoes of Honshū
Active volcanoes
Volcanic crater lakes
Complex volcanoes
Volcanoes of Gunma Prefecture
Kusatsu-Shirane
Stratovolcanoes of Japan